Unión Salaverry is a Peruvian football club, playing in the city of Uchumayo, Arequipa, Peru.

History
Unión Salaverry is of the clubs with greater tradition in the city of Uchumayo, Arequipa.

In the 2010, the club participated in the Liga Superior de Arequipa.

Honours

Regional
Liga Provincial de Arequipa:
Runner-up (1): 2009

Liga Distrital de Uchumayo:
Winners (15): 1982, 1983, 1984, 1985, 1987, 1990, 1991, 1992, 1994, 1996, 2000, 2002, 2006, 2014, 2015

See also
List of football clubs in Peru
Peruvian football league system

External links
 Liga Superior de Arequipa 2010

Football clubs in Peru
Association football clubs established in 1939